The Maranhão gubernatorial election of 1965 as held in Brazilian state of Maranhão on October 3, alongside Brazil's general elections. UDN candidate, José Sarney, was elected on October 3, 1965.

References  

October 1965 events in South America
1965 Brazilian gubernatorial elections

1965